Gigant (stylized as GIGANT) is a Japanese manga series written and illustrated by Hiroya Oku. It was serialized in Shogakukan's Big Comic Superior from December 2017 to September 2021, with its chapters collected in ten tankōbon volumes. The series follows pornographic actress Chiho "Papico" Johansson, who gains the ability to grow into a giant. With the support of aspiring film maker Rei Yokoyamada, she uses her power to protect Tokyo from attacking giants. In North America, the series is licensed in English by Seven Seas Entertainment, who has released the volumes in print since 2020.

Plot
Rei Yokoyamada, a teenager aspiring to become a film maker, learns that the pornographic actress Chiho "Papico" Johansson lives near him. Chiho is shunned by her family and neighbors because of her job, but develops a friendship with Rei. Chiho finds an injured old man wearing a helmet and underwear. When she tries to help him, he attaches a device to her wrist that does not come off, before transforming into a doll. Chiho discovers that the device lets her grow into a giant with incredible strength and durability, and shrink back to her regular size, though the growth only applies to her body, tearing her clothing and leaving her naked. Chiho's insecure and abusive boyfriend Ryuji returns home while she demonstrates her growth power for Rei, and assumes she is cheating on him; she uses her giant power to stop him from assaulting Rei, and Ryuji leaves, ending their relationship. Eventually, Chiho and Rei begin dating.

During this, a website called Enjoy the End becomes popular, where users can vote on proposed events, and the winners become reality regardless of how impossible they should be. These include a rain of excrement; a famous actor running naked through Shinjuku; the death of a celebrity rumored to be a murderer; and an earthquake. Following one request, a gigantic god of destruction descends on Tokyo, demolishing buildings and killing many. At the same time, another gigantic monster attacks New York, and is fought by a gigantic man. Rei's family takes refuge underground, and Chiho uses her giant power to fight and kill the god.

The police identify Chiho as the giant woman, and arrest her on suspicion of criminal insurrection. She faces execution, but is granted amnesty after more giants and three more gods appear, who she manages to kill. After it becomes known that Chiho, now a celebrity, is dating a highschool student, she loses entertainment industry opportunities and they decide to put their relationship on hold. Meanwhile, the United States drops a nuclear bomb on Honolulu to stop giants ravaging North America.

A group of time travelers from 2135, dressed like the old man and with similar growth powers, find Chiho, and tell her that two artificial intelligences, Socrates and Plato, were created in 2019 and leaked onto the internet, and, connecting to a Chinese satellite, built a gigantic facility in space from debris; using its machinery, including a bio-printer, the AIs operated Enjoy the End to understand humanity. By 2135, Socrates and Plato have drastically reduced the human population, which is why the group traveled to 2019 to destroy them.

Media

Manga
Gigant, written and illustrated by Hiroya Oku, was serialized in Shogakukan's Big Comic Superior from December 8, 2017. to September 24, 2021. Shogakukan collected its chapters in ten tankōbon volumes, released from May 30, 2018, to December 28, 2021.

In July 2019, Seven Seas Entertainment announced the license of the manga for English language release in March 2020.

Volume list

Related media
Shogakukan published a drawn gravure set featuring Chiho in a bikini in 2019, and a photo set featuring gravure model  cosplaying in Chiho's t-shirt and a bikini in 2020.

Reception
The series has performed well commercially, with over one million volumes in circulation as of July 2020. As of December 2020, the manga had 1.2 million copies in circulation.

References

Further reading

External links
 

Fiction about size change
Science fiction anime and manga
Seinen manga
Seven Seas Entertainment titles
Shogakukan manga